Audoubert may refer to

Surname
Jean Audoubert (1924–2008), French rugby player

Place
Tuc d'Audoubert, French cave